Tillandsia carlsoniae is a species of flowering plant in the genus Tillandsia. This species is endemic to Mexico. It is named after the person that discovered it in Chiapas, Margery C. Carlson.

Cultivars
 Tillandsia 'Hidden Charm'

References

Further reading

BSI Cultivar Registry Retrieved 11 October 2009

carlsoniae
Flora of Mexico